Fabius Township may refer to:

Iowa
 Fabius Township, Davis County, Iowa

Michigan
 Fabius Township, Michigan

Missouri
 Fabius Township, Knox County, Missouri
 Fabius Township, Marion County, Missouri
 Fabius Township, Schuyler County, Missouri

Township name disambiguation pages